Liptenara batesi is a butterfly in the family Lycaenidae. It is found in Cameroon and the Democratic Republic of the Congo (Equateur, Tshuapa and Tshopo).

References

Butterflies described in 1915
Poritiinae
Taxa named by George Thomas Bethune-Baker